Count of Toreno is a title in the Spanish nobility.  The title was first bestowed on Álvaro Queipo de Llano by Philip IV of Spain in 1657.

List of Counts of Toreno

Álvaro Queipo de Llano, 1st Count of Toreno
Fernando Queipo de Llano, 2nd Count of Toreno
Fernando Queipo de Llano, 3rd Count of Toreno
Fernando Ignacio José Queipo de Llano, 4th Count of Toreno
José Joaquín Queipo de Llano, 5th Count of Toreno (1728–1792)
José Marcelino Queipo de Llano, 6th Count of Toreno
José María Queipo de Llano, 7th Count of Toreno (1786–1843)
Francisco de Borja Queipo de Llano, 8th Count of Toreno (1840–1890)
Álvaro de Borja Queipo de Llano, 9th Count of Toreno (1864–1938)
Francisco de Borja Queipo de Llano, 10th Count of Toreno (1898–1954)
Francisco de Borja Queipo de Llano, 11th Count of Toreno (1927–2002)
Francisco de Borja Queipo de Llano, 12th Count of Toreno (born 1956)
The heir apparent is the present holder’s son, Francisco de Borgia Queipo de Llano (b. 1986)

External links

Genealogy of the Counts of Toreno

Toreno
Lists of counts
1657 establishments in Spain